The Duterte Youth, officially the Duty to Energize the Republic through the Enlightenment of the Youth Sectoral Party-list Organization, is a right-wing youth organization which supports the administration of former Philippine President Rodrigo Duterte. They also campaigned to win a seat in the House of Representatives through party-list representation in the 2019 elections where they secured a single seat. However the group was subject of a controversy due to its nominees including Ronald Cardema not being part of the youth sector themselves.

It is led by Ronald Cardema who is the group's chairman. Cardema is also the chairman of the Kabataan for Bongbong Movement, a youth organization supporting Bongbong Marcos.

On October 13, 2020, in a vote of 4–1, the Commission on Elections (Comelec) has granted the nominee of Duterte Youth partylist, Ducielle Marie Suarez-Cardema, a certificate of proclamation in relation to the 2019 midterm polls.

The group, due to its chosen name, has been likened to the Hitler Youth of the Nazi Party.

History
The Duterte Youth was founded by Ronald Cardema in 2016 to support the presidential campaign of Rodrigo Duterte. The group held its first rally on November 25, which coincided with protests against the burial of Ferdinand Marcos at the Libingan ng mga Bayani, in order to express its support for Duterte. A self-reported figure of 20 to 50 people attended the rally.

In December 2016, Cardema claimed that the Duterte Youth has already 600 members across the Philippines.

The Duterte Youth reportedly said in February 2017 that they plan to recruit 1 million members by recruiting 1,000 people in each municipality and 5,000 each in each city ages 15 to 30.

Name
Cardema acknowledged that his group has been likened to the Hitler Youth of the Nazi Party but emphasized that the German organization had existed in a "different generation, [on] a different continent, in a different context". He responded to those drawing comparisons that the Hitler Youth has no patent over its name, that it is not "forbidden" for a group to attach the word "Youth" to a name of a non-German President, and remarked that "all countries have youth".

House of Representatives elections
The Duterte Youth made a successful bid to win at least a seat in the 2019 Philippine House of Representatives elections through party-list representation. Their five official nominees were as follows from 1st to 5th: (Ducielle Marie Suarez, Joseph de Guzman, Benilda de Guzman, Arnaldo Villafranca, and Elizabeth Anne Cardema). However, all five nominees withdrew and Duterte Youth leader Ronald Cardema who was also National Youth Commission chairman filed a substitution in a bid to fill in the seat himself. In relation to Cardema's bid, factors whether he filed substitution in time before polls closed on May 13 and whether he is qualified to represent the Duterte Youth in the House of Representatives were put into dispute.

Six of the seven members of the Comelec decided to give "due course" or deliberate further on Cardema's bid and four others accepted the withdrawal of Duterte Youth's five initial nominees. Only Election Commissioner Rowena Guanzon expressed dissent who argued that the three original nominees of ages 31 to 36, and also Cardema who is 34 years old, are not eligible to represent the party-list as a representative of the youth sector as per Section 9 of the Republic Act No. 7941 given that nominees should be aged 25 to 30 on election day. The commissioner also views the filing of the withdrawal of the original nominees at 5:30pm on May 12, 2019, a Sunday, as invalid since its contrary to Resolution No. 8665 which states that filing should be done on a regular working day during office hours. Cardema defended his eligibility insisting that the party while it represents the youth, also represents professionals in general as well.

Cardema's bid was criticized by Senator Panfilo Lacson who said that the Duterte Youth partylist and its leader "are one of the many reasons" that the party-list representation system has become a "joke".

Representatives to Congress

Disqualification of Ronald Cardema 
On August 5, 2019, the first division of the Commission on Elections (Philippines) (COMELEC) canceled his nomination as the party-list representative of Duterte Youth by a vote of 2–0. The decision was concurred by commissioners Rowena Guanzon and Marlon Casquejo, while Commissioner Al Parreño was away on official businesses. The cancellation stemmed from Cardema's claim that he was eligible for nomination on his Certificate of Acceptance and Nomination, which the COMELEC deemed "material misrepresentation" because of the 25- to 30-year-old age requirement as set out by the Party List Law. A certificate of the proclamation will not be issued to Cardema and he shall not be able to seat in the House of Representatives of the Philippines.

The COMELEC also disagreed with Cardema's claim that the organization represented professionals, stating, "“Records would show that the Respondent started to highlight the professionals only after the filing of a petition against him questioning his eligibility to represent the youth sector. Pursuing such afterthought would not be enough to comply with the express mandate of Party-list law which requires changes in affiliation should be done at least six months before the election to be eligible for nomination.”

On February 12, 2020, the COMELEC in a ruling ruled with finality the disqualification of Ronald Cardema's nomination of the party-list group, Duterte Youth. The ruling that junks the motion for reconsideration (MR) filed by Cardema, noted that Cardema's own filling of his withdrawal as the first nominee being ineligible to sit as a youth sector representative tantamounts to "acceptance of the ruling".

On October 13, 2020, the COMELEC granted Duterte Youth partylist nominee, Ducielle Marie Suárez Cardema, a certificate of proclamation.

Political positions

Government policies
According to Cardema in December 2016, his group supports all of Duterte's policies including the death penalty and federalism, with the exception of the deadly war on drugs. He said that the group only supports detainment of suspected drug lords and users. Cardema suggests rehabilitating addicts pointing to the fact that a drug rehabilitation facility had just opened at that time.

In August 2016, the group has expressed support for the revival of mandatory Reserve Officers' Training Corps program for college students as well as support for Citizenship Advancement Training for high school students and scouting for elementary students. The Duterte Youth cited South Korea and Singapore for their similar programs for the youth which they believe has instilled nationalism, discipline and cooperation among their youth.

When the group reportedly announced their recruitment plans, the youth organization said that they will help secure the presidency of Duterte against plots to oust him, as well as help the police and military detain criminals.

References

2016 establishments in the Philippines
Youth organizations established in 2016
Youth organizations based in the Philippines
Political movements in the Philippines
Anti-communist organizations
Political youth organizations
Presidency of Rodrigo Duterte
Party-lists represented in the House of Representatives of the Philippines